The Islamic Community of Bosnia and Herzegovina is a religious organisation of Muslims in Bosnia and Herzegovina. It is also recognised as the highest representative body of Muslims in the region, especially in Serbia (Sandžak), Croatia, Slovenia, Montenegro, Hungary and Bosniak diaspora.

It was established in Sarajevo in 1882, by the Austria-Hungary, to have a controlled Islamic Community in Bosnia and Herzegovina since the Ottoman Empire lost control over Bosnia and Herzegovina in 1878.

The current leader is Husein Kavazović.

History 

The Islamic Community was established in 1882 during the Austrian-Hungarian rule over Bosnia and Herzegovina. After creation of the Kingdom of Serbs, Croats and Slovenes, the seat of the Islamic Community was moved from Sarajevo to Belgrade but was moved back to Sarajevo in 1936. 
During the breakup of Yugoslavia, the organized community on Yugoslav level broke up, while the majority of local and regional Muslim communities accepted the historic authority of the Islamic Community of Bosnia and Herzegovina .

The Islamic Community of Bosnia and Herzegovina was initially weak, but with the help from Alija Izetbegović, Bosnia and Herzegovina's president, as well as key military leaders, it became a pillar of the Bosniak national identity. Under tenure of the Grand Mufti Mustafa Cerić, who held this office from April 1993 until November 2012, the Islamic Community promoted Bosniak culture, politics and identity, with its influence extending beyond the faithful and attracting many who were not practicing Muslims during the socialist period, as well as Bosniaks and other Slavic Muslims living in the region of Sandžak and elsewhere.

Leaders of Bosnian Muslims

Grand Muftis of Bosnia and Herzegovina
1882–1893 Mustafa Hilmi Hadžiomerović (1816–1895)
1893–1909 Mehmed Teufik Azabagić (1838–1918)
1909–1910 Ahmed Munib Korkut, acting
1910–1912 Sulejman Šarac (1850–1927)
1912–1914 Mehmed Teufik Okić (1870–1932), acting
1914–1930 Mehmed Džemaludin Čaušević (1870–1938)

Grand Muftis of Yugoslavia
1930–1936 Ibrahim Maglajlić (1861–1936), seat in Belgrade
1936–1938 Salih Safvet Bašić (1886–1948), acting
1938–1942 Fehim Spaho (1877–1942) 
1942–1947 Salih Safvet Bašić (1886–1948), acting
1947–1957 Ibrahim Fejić (1879–1962)
1957–1975 Sulejman Kemura (1908–1975)
1975–1987 Naim Hadžiabdić (1918–1987)
1987 Ferhat Šeta, acting
1987–1989 Husein Mujić (1918–1994) 
1990–1991 Jakub Selimoski (1946–2013), acting
1991–1993 Jakub Selimoski (1946–2013)

Grand Muftis of Bosnia and Herzegovina
seat is vacant, Jakub Selimoski left Sarajevo in 1993
1993–1996 Mustafa Cerić (*1952), acting
1996–2012 Mustafa Cerić (*1952)
2012–present Husein Kavazović (*1964)

Jurisdiction 

The Islamic Community of Bosnia and Herzegovina and head of the community, Grand Mufti of Bosnia and Herzegovina, are highest religious authorities for approximately 4 million Bosnian Muslims in the world.
The Islamic Community of Bosnia and Herzegovina has jurisdiction over the entire Bosnia and Herzegovina, as well as Croatia through muftiluk of Zagreb, headed by Aziz Hasanović, Slovenia and Bosniak religious communities and mosques around the world.   However, there is a dispute in Serbia over what Islamic Community has jurisdiction over the country, Bosnian or Serbian. Sandžak Mufti Muamer Zukorlić, who is supported by the ex-Grand Mufti Mustafa Cerić, wants that they remain under the jurisdiction of the Islamic Community of Bosnia and Herzegovina, while Grand Mufti Adem Zilkić wants to expand the jurisdiction of the Islamic Community of Serbia to the entire country. He was supported by the deceased Grand Mufti of Yugoslavia Hamdija Jusufspahić, and later by Hamdija's son Muhamed.

Islamic Community of Montenegro, although not formally under jurisdiction of Islamic Community of Bosnia and Herzegovina, recognizes Grand Mufti of Bosnia and Herzegovina as the highest religious and moral authority of Muslims in the region.

The highest body of Muslims in Hungary, Hungarian Islamic Council, have expressed willingness to become part of Islamic Community of Bosnia and Herzegovina and for Grand Mufti of Bosnia and Herzegovina to act as supreme religious authority for Hungarian Muslims.

Sufi orders in areas under jurisdiction of Islamic Community are operating within Tariqa Center (Tarikatski centar) and are autonomous but subordinated to the Islamic Community and the Grand Mufti.

Media
Beside BIR TV, Islamic Community of Bosnia and Herzegovina is, via Media centar d.o.o. Sarajevo, also owner of Preporod weekly newspapers, Islamic radio station - Radio BIR, MINA News agency and Preporod.info website.

See also 

 Islam in Bosnia and Herzegovina

References

Notes

Sources 

 

Islam in Bosnia and Herzegovina
Islamic organizations established in 1993
1993 establishments in Bosnia and Herzegovina